The 1997–98 season saw Southend United compete in the Football League Second Division where they finished in 24th position with 43 points, suffering relegation to the Third Division.

Final league table

Results
Southend United's score comes first

Legend

Football League Second Division

FA Cup

League Cup

Football League Trophy

Squad statistics

References
General
Southend United 1997–98 at soccerbase.com (use drop down list to select relevant season)

Specific

Southend United F.C. seasons
Southend United